Mouche (French for "fly") may refer to:

Fashion 
 Mouche, an artificial beauty mark fashionable in Europe in the 16th and 17th centuries
 Mouche or soul patch, small patch of hair just below the lower lip

Fiction
 La Mouche (novel), a novel by George Langelaan
 in the 1943 film Five Graves to Cairo, the character played by Anne Baxter
 a character in the novel The Lost Steps by Alejo Carpentier
 The Flies (French: Les Mouches), a play by French writer Jean-Paul Sartre
 French remake of British TV series Fleabag

Games 
 Mouche (card game), an old French card game and ancestor of (Lanter)loo and Mistigri

Medical 
 Mouche de moutarde, a cataplasm to treat respiratory infections in Eastern Canada
 Mouches volantes, a minor form of visual impairment

Music
 "La Mouche", a single by the band Cassius
 Sandy Mouche, a Swedish band
 "Duo de la Mouche", duet from the opera Orphée aux Enfers by Jacques Offenbach

People 
 Mouche Phillips (born 1973), Australian actress
 Yohanna Petros Mouche (born 1943), Iraqi Syriac Roman Catholic prelate

Places
 La Mouche, Manche, a commune in France
 La Mouche, Lyon, former name of Gerland, a quarter of Lyon, France
 Anse la Mouche, a tourist spot on Mahé, Seychelles in the Seychelles islands

Vessels
 Bateaux Mouches, tourist boats in Paris
 Mouche No. 2-class schooner-avisos, 19th century French navy ships